Corbett Field may refer to:

Corbett Field (Minot), a baseball park in Minot, North Dakota
Hi Corbett Field, a baseball stadium in Tucson, Arizona
Corbett Field (Wyoming), the former football field at the University of Wyoming in Laramie, Wyoming
Corbett Stadium, a soccer field in Tampa, Florida